Passant Hemida Abdel Salam (born 28 September 1996) is an Egyptian sprinter. She won two medals at the 2019 African Games.

She holds her country's national records in the 100 and 200 metres.

On 30 June Passant sat a new 100 m games record at the Mediterranean Games after she ran 11.10s with a tail wind of 0.5 m/s, she also sat a new 200m record at the same tournament after she ran 22.47s.

International competitions

Personal bests
Outdoor
100 metres – 11.10 NR GR
200 metres – 22.47 NR GR

References

1996 births
Living people
Egyptian female sprinters
Athletes (track and field) at the 2018 Mediterranean Games
Athletes (track and field) at the 2022 Mediterranean Games
Athletes (track and field) at the 2019 African Games
African Games silver medalists for Egypt
African Games bronze medalists for Egypt
African Games medalists in athletics (track and field)
Competitors at the 2019 Summer Universiade
Mediterranean Games competitors for Egypt
21st-century Egyptian women